Deseret Ranches refers to the ranching operations of the Corporation of the President of The Church of Jesus Christ of Latter-day Saints in Central Florida. The Ranches include several organizations, including Deseret Ranches of Florida, Deseret Cattle and Citrus, Taylor Creek Management, East Central Florida Services, AgReserves, and Farmland Reserve. Currently, Deseret Ranches is the most productive cow-calf ranch in the United States.

Geography

This ranch, owned by The Church of Jesus Christ of Latter-day Saints (LDS Church), spreads over the three central Florida counties of Osceola, Orange, and Brevard.  Covering almost  of land, 90 ranchers and their families live on the ranch. The ranch maintains 44,000 head of beef cattle. It is a for-profit operation and is not a normal part of the humanitarian efforts of the LDS Church. Gordon B. Hinckley, former president of the church, has said, "We have felt that good farms, over a long period, represent a safe investment where the assets of the Church may be preserved and enhanced, while at the same time, they are available as an agricultural resource to feed people should there come a time of need."

History
The earliest plans for this ranch were made in 1949, and in 1950 the original  were purchased.  Deseret Ranch now covers an area , with a separate section surrounding Kenansville in Osceola County.

In 1997 it was the world's largest beef ranch, and the land was worth an estimated $858 million.

Operations
Like their other financial details, the LDS Church does not disclose the revenue or valuation of the ranch. Still, it is known that in 2000, they moved 16 million pounds (7300 t) of calves, which then translated to about $16 million in revenue. In 2008, Deseret Ranch discussed selling part of the property for a development near Orlando, Florida, but the proposed rezoning was withdrawn before approval.

The Deseret Ranch also brings in revenue from the mining of native shell beds (used throughout Florida to pave roads), orange groves, hunting permits, and sales of ornamental palm trees.

In 2011, having won control of some of its water from the St. Johns River Water Management District, it was planning on selling some to Cocoa, Florida.

See also
 Henry D. Moyle

Notes

Further reading
 
 "From book to boom: how the Mormons plan a city for 500,000 in Florida" – The Guardian

External links

 Deseret Ranches official site

1950 establishments in Florida
Brevard County, Florida
Deseret Management Corporation
Landmarks in Florida
Orange County, Florida
Osceola County, Florida
Properties of the Church of Jesus Christ of Latter-day Saints
Ranches in Florida
The Church of Jesus Christ of Latter-day Saints in the United States